Marcelle Deschênes-Harvey née Price (born 2 March 1939) is a Canadian multi-media artist, music educator and composer of electroacoustic music. She was a professor at the University of Montreal.

Early life and education
Marcelle Deschênes was born near Rimouski, Quebec. She graduated with a bachelor's and master's degree from the University of Montreal, studying from 1963 to 1967 with Jean Papineau-Couture and Serge Garant. She continued her education in France with François Bayle, Henri Chiarucci, and Guy Reibel of the Groupe de Recherches musicales de Paris. She also studied audio-visual techniques at the Pierre Schaeffer's Conservatoire and analysis at the École César-Franck with Olivier Alain. At the University of Paris, she studied with Daniel Charles, Claude Laloum and Jean-Étienne Marie.

Career
While completing her studies, Deschênes created several multi-media works. She returned to Canada in 1971 and took a teaching and research position at the electronic music studio of Laval University, where she helped organize a sound library and composed the soundtracks for several films. In 1979 she founded the electroacoustic studio Bruit Blanc.

In 1980 Deschênes took a position as professor of music at the University of Montreal, teaching the composition of electroacoustic music.  In collaboration with visual artists, she continued to create and exhibit multimedia projects, including OPÉRAaaaAH! in 1983.

Honors and awards
First prize for mixed-media music at the sixth Concours international de musique électroacoustique in Bourges in 1978
Gold medal at the Multi-Images international competition in Munich (1989)

Works
Deschênes composes multimedia works and film soundtracks. Selected works include:
1 (1966)
Voz (cantate mitrailleuse) (1968)
7+7+7+7 ou aussi progressions sur la circonférence du jaune au rouge par l'orange ou du rouge au bleu par le violet, ou même embrassant le pourtour total (1968)
Talilalilalilalarequiem (1970)
Amertube film soundtrack (1973)
Le Phasé mou film soundtrack (1973)
Le Port de Montréal film soundtrack (1975)
Moll, Opéra-Lilliput pour six roches molles (1976)
OPÉRAaaaAH! (1983)
L'Écran humain, (1983)
deUSirae (1985)
Lux (1985) in collaboration with Renée Bourassa
Big Bang (1987)
Noël réinventé (1988)
Ludi (1990), opera-theatre work with Renée Bourassa

Her works have been recorded and issued on CD, including:
Big Bang II (1990)
Halogènes (1991)

References

1939 births
Living people
20th-century classical composers
Canadian music educators
Women classical composers
Canadian classical composers
20th-century Canadian composers
Women music educators
Canadian women in electronic music
20th-century women composers
20th-century Canadian women artists
Canadian women composers